Guy Kent is an American actor and producer. He stars in and produces the American-Icelandic international drama Autumn Lights with the producers of the Icelandic Academy Award winning film Metalhead, David Gordon Green's Prince Avalanche, and Nordic Council Film Prize-winning Either Way. The film was a NYFCS Pick and was released in theaters in North America on October 21, 2016.

Life and career
He stars in the international drama Autumn Lights opposite Icelandic Academy Award winners Thora Bjorg Helga, Sveinn Ólafur Gunnarsson and Borgia's Marta Gastini. He produced the film with the film's director Angad Aulakh and award-winning Icelandic producers Davið Óskar Ólafsson and Árni Filippusson.

Autumn Lights was honored as a Peter Travers New York Film Critics Series (NYFCS) pick before it opened in select theaters in North America on October 21, 2016. In Fall 2016, he shared in the nomination for Best Film at Norway's Cinema Scandinavia Awards. In addition, Autumn Lights was shortlisted by AMPAS for Best Original Score and Best Original Song for the Academy Awards in 2017.

He also appeared on ABC's FlashForward.

Kent was born in Los Angeles on November 2, 1989 and graduated from the School of Cinematic Arts at the University of Southern California.

Filmography

Film

Television

Awards
2022 Cult Critic Movie Awards
Nominated - Jury Prize for Best Actor for Autumn Lights, Riviera International Film Festival (Italy)
Nominated - Grand Jury Prize for Best Picture for Autumn Lights, Riviera International Film Festival (Italy)
Nominated - Best Picture for Autumn Lights, Cinema Scandinavia Awards 2016 (Norway)

References

External links
 

1989 births
Living people
Male actors from Los Angeles
Film producers from California
American male film actors
American male television actors
21st-century American male actors
People from Los Angeles
University of Southern California alumni